The 1982 NCAA Division I women's volleyball tournament was the second year of the NCAA Women's Volleyball Championship for Division I. In 1982, the tournament participants were expanded from 20 to 28.

The University of Hawaii won the NCAA championship by defeating defending national champion Southern California in five games. Hawaii finished the year at 33-1.

In the consolation match, San Diego State defeated Stanford in five games to claim third place for the second straight year.

Brackets

Northwest regional

South regional

Mideast regional

West regional

Final Four - Alex G. Spanos Center, Stockton, California

NCAA Tournament records

There are three NCAA tournament records that were set in the 1982 NCAA tournament that have not yet been broken.

Service aces, match (individual record) - Beverly Robinson, Tennessee - 11 vs. Northwestern
Services aces, match (team record) - Tennessee, 20 (vs. Northwestern)
Solo blocks, tournament (individual record) - Deitre Collins, Hawaii - 15 (1 vs. San Jose State, 6 vs. Cal Poly, 2 vs. Stanford, 6 vs. Southern California).

References

NCAA
NCAA Women's Volleyball Championship
Sports competitions in Stockton, California
College sports tournaments in California
1982 in sports in California
Volleyball in California
December 1982 sports events in the United States
Women's sports in California